Shahjahanpur is a town situated in the state of Uttar Pradesh in India, and about 30 kilometres from the district headquarters at Meerut. there population of 14,944, of which the majority are Muslim. There are also about 600 households of Hindus in the village, mainly belonging to the Jatav caste.

The village is named after the Mughal Emperor Shahjahan, and was said to have been founded by Mohammed Abbas Khan, a Dilazak Pashtun.  Abbas Khan was granted an estate by the Mughal Emperor, who named the village in his honour. A significant portion of the village's population still belongs to the Dilazak tribe. Other Muslim groups include the RaiBhaat, Qureshi and Ansari.

It has  achieveved many developments.

Shahjahanpur is also known as mango market. Shahjahanpur supplies a lot of fruit like mango and lychee all over the country.
Shahjahanpur is a more well-developed town as compared to other towns.
Shahjahanpur is a town of mainly the Pathan tribe. It is named in the honor of Shahjahan Badshah. It is giving many professions to the surrounding town.

Economy

Shahjahanpur organised a mango Exhibition/Festival in 1992 in collaboration with the department of Horticulture, Govt of India. On this occasion horticulture department recognised Shahjahanpur as a mango belt. For many decades Shahjahanpur is growing millions of fruit, timber, and ornamental plants annually such as Gulabjamun, Dasehri, Chonsa, Ratol as well as Peach, Pears, and Lichi. Thus, serving the country as a reliable source of quality plants, along with growing and producing multi-genus plants in its nurseries. Shahjahanpur is a great wholesale fruit market attracting wholesale customers, suppliers, and exporters from all the states of the country as well as Bangladesh, Nepal, and China, and fetching huge amounts of foreign exchange in the country by its plants and fruits exports.                                               In the plants nurseries and fruits business, Shahjahanpur is creating a great number of jobs for hundreds of thousands of daily wage workers of neighbouring towns and villages and providing a lot of paying and promising opportunities for entrepreneurs.

Culture

Shahjahanpur has rendered remarkable sacrifices and appreciable services in the cause of freedom fighting moment of India under the leadership of Babuji Ilhamullah Khan, Firoz Mand Khan, Pandit Chandi Prasad and Maulana Mujtaba Khan Rahmani.                                In addition to the above Shahjahanpur has been playing a leading role in cultural and educational fields since its foundation and illuminating the torch of education in surrounding towns and villages. Maulana Mohammed Dawood Khan Rahmani was a profile author who translated Muqaddamah Ibne Khaldun and Tafseer Ibne Kaseer into Urdu language.

Recently a book Hayate kaynat or the life of Cosmos authored by Saud Mustafa Khan Nadvi has been published with the intention to instill, cultivate and propagate the latest scientific investigations and researchers, particularly among Muslims who still, in the 21st century seems to be averted to science.

References

External links 
https://horticulture.gov.in

Villages in Meerut district